Events from the year 1987 in Canada.

Incumbents

Crown 
 Monarch – Elizabeth II

Federal government 
 Governor General – Jeanne Sauvé
 Prime Minister – Brian Mulroney
 Chief Justice – Brian Dickson (Manitoba)
 Parliament – 33rd

Provincial governments

Lieutenant governors 
Lieutenant Governor of Alberta – Helen Hunley
Lieutenant Governor of British Columbia – Robert Gordon Rogers 
Lieutenant Governor of Manitoba – George Johnson 
Lieutenant Governor of New Brunswick – George Stanley (until August 20) then Gilbert Finn 
Lieutenant Governor of Newfoundland – James McGrath 
Lieutenant Governor of Nova Scotia – Alan Abraham 
Lieutenant Governor of Ontario – Lincoln Alexander 
Lieutenant Governor of Prince Edward Island – Lloyd MacPhail 
Lieutenant Governor of Quebec – Gilles Lamontagne 
Lieutenant Governor of Saskatchewan – Frederick Johnson

Premiers 
Premier of Alberta – Don Getty
Premier of British Columbia – Bill Vander Zalm 
Premier of Manitoba – Howard Pawley 
Premier of New Brunswick – Richard Hatfield (until October 27) then Frank McKenna 
Premier of Newfoundland – Brian Peckford 
Premier of Nova Scotia – John Buchanan 
Premier of Ontario – David Peterson 
Premier of Prince Edward Island – Joe Ghiz 
Premier of Quebec – Robert Bourassa 
Premier of Saskatchewan – Grant Devine

Territorial governments

Commissioners 
 Commissioner of Yukon – John Kenneth McKinnon 
 Commissioner of Northwest Territories – John Havelock Parker

Premiers 
Premier of the Northwest Territories – Nick Sibbeston (until November 12) then Dennis Patterson
Premier of Yukon – Tony Penikett

Events
 January 1 – Frobisher Bay changes its name to Iqaluit.
 April 21 – The lifeless body of Claude Jutra was finally found in the Saint Lawrence River near Cap-Santé.
 April 30 – Provincial premiers agree to Meech Lake Accord.
 May 22 – Rick Hansen returns home to Vancouver after his Man in Motion world tour.
 June 30 – Canada introduces a $1 coin, commonly called loonie; the dollar bill is withdrawn in 1989.
 a bill to restore the death penalty was defeated by the House of Commons in a 148–127 vote, in which Prime Minister Brian Mulroney, Minister of Justice Ray Hnatyshyn, and Minister of External Affairs Joe Clark opposed the bill, whereas Deputy Prime Minister Donald Mazankowski and a majority of Progressive Conservative MPs supported it.
 July 3 – Quebec City becomes the first city in North America to become a UNESCO World Heritage Site.
 July 14 – Montreal is hit by a series of severe thunderstorms during the Montreal Flood of 1987.
 July 31 – The Edmonton Tornado kills 27 people.
 September 10 – Ontario election: David Peterson's Liberals win a majority.
 September 20 – Pope John Paul II visits the Northwest Territories.
 October – Canadian and American negotiators reach agreement on the Canadian-American Free Trade Agreement.
 October 27 – Frank McKenna becomes premier of New Brunswick, replacing Richard Hatfield.
 October 31 – The Reform Party of Canada is founded.
 November 12 – Dennis Patterson becomes government leader of the Northwest Territories, replacing Nick Sibbeston.
 November 30 – Several new Canadian specialty channels are licensed: YTV, VisionTV, CBC Newsworld, The Weather Network/MeteoMedia, and one pay-television channel: The Family Channel.
 December 16 – Chartwell Technology company is founded in British Columbia.
Undated
 ElderTreks, Canadian adventure travel company is founded.

Arts and literature

New works
William Bell: Metal Head
Dave Duncan:  A Rose-Red City
Michael Ignatieff: The Russian Album
Irving Layton: Fortunate Exile
Donald Jack: This One's on Me
Steve McCaffery: Evoba
Antonine Maillet: Margot la folle
Farley Mowat: Virunga: The Passion of Dian Fossey
Paul Quarrington, King Leary
Mordecai Richler: Jacob Two-Two and the Dinosaur

Awards
See 1987 Governor General's Awards for a complete list of winners and finalists for those awards.
Books in Canada First Novel Award: Karen Lawrence, The Life of Helen Alone
Gerald Lampert Award: Rosemary Sullivan, The Space a Name Makes
Marian Engel Award: Audrey Thomas
Pat Lowther Award: Heather Spears, How to Read Faces
Stephen Leacock Award: W.P. Kinsella, The Fencepost Chronicles
Trillium Book Award: Michael Ondaatje, In the Skin of a Lion
Vicky Metcalf Award: Robert Munsch

Music
November 27 – Rock band Cowboy Junkies record their most famous album, The Trinity Session, at Toronto's Church of the Holy Trinity.

Sport
January 26 – Calgary's Bret Hart wins his first title when he became the third Canadian to win the World Wrestling Federation Tag Team Championship (with Jim Neidhart as The Hart Foundation) by defeating the British Bulldogs in Tampa, Florida, for the WWF's Superstars of Wrestling
May 15 – Medicine Hat Tigers win their first Memorial Cup by defeating the Oshawa Generals 6 to 2. The final game was played at Oshawa Civic Auditorium in Oshawa, Ontario
May 31 – Edmonton Oilers win their third Stanley Cup by defeating the Philadelphia Flyers 4 games to 3. The deciding Game 7 was played at Northlands Coliseum in Edmonton. Brandon, Manitoba's Ron Hextall was awarded the Conn Smythe Trophy in a losing effort.
June 24 – The "new" Montreal Allouettes cease operations
August 30 – Canadian sprinter Ben Johnson sets a new world record in the 100-metre dash.
November 21 – McGill Redmen win their first Vanier Cup by defeating the UBC Thunderbirds by a score of 47–11 in the 23rd Vanier Cup
November 29 – Edmonton Eskimos win their tenth Grey Cup by defeating the Toronto Argonauts 38 to 36 in the 75th Grey Cup played at BC Place Stadium in Vancouver

Births
January 1 
Gilbert Brulé, ice hockey player
Devin Setoguchi, ice hockey player
January 15 
 Kelleigh Ryan, fencer
 Michael Seater, actor, director, producer, and screenwriter
January 16 – Jake Epstein, actor
January 19 – Alexandra Orlando, rhythmic gymnast
January 21 – Andrew Forde, engineering graduate student and musician
February 12 – Anna Hopkins, actress
February 21 – Elliot Page, actor
February 25
Andrew Poje, figure skater
Eva Avila, singer
March 31 – Winston Venable, American football player
April 1 – Mackenzie Davis, actress 
April 4 – Sarah Gadon, actress
April 9 – Felix Cartal, DJ and producer
April 10 – Shay Mitchell, actress, model, entrepreneur, and author
April 11 – Lights (Valerie Poxleitner), singer and songwriter
April 27
 Joëlle Békhazi, water polo player
 Alexandra Carter, voice actress
 Emma Taylor-Isherwood, actress
April 30 – Jeremy Bordeleau, canoeist
May 1 – Marissa Ponich, fencer
May 16 – Kylie Stone, artistic gymnast
May 17 – Con Kudaba, water polo player
May 29 – Noah Reid, actor and musician
June 18 – Niels Schneider, French-Canadian actor
June 22 – Melanie Banville, artistic gymnast
July 7
Mylène Mackay, actress
Steven Crowder, American-Canadian political youtuber
August 7 – Sidney Crosby, ice hockey player
August 8 – Jenn Proske, actress
August 16 – Carey Price, ice hockey goaltender
August 25 – Stacey Farber, actress
September 2
 Mazin Elsadig, American-Canadian actor
 Scott Moir, ice dancer
September 16 – Christina Schmidt, actress and model
September 23 – Shannon Chan-Kent, actress and voice actress
September 29 – Kyle Riabko, pop singer and guitarist
October 6 – Kia Byers, canoeist
October 15 
 Jesse Levine, Canadian-American tennis player
 Chantal Strand, actress and voice actress
October 16 – Pascal Wollach, swimmer
October 29 – Jessica Dubé, figure skater
November 12 – Bryan Little, ice hockey player
November 15 – Ludi Lin, Chinese-Canadian actor 
December 12 – Kate Todd, actress and singer-songwriter

Deaths

January to June

January 5 – Margaret Laurence, novelist and short story writer (b.1926)
January 5 – Herman Smith-Johannsen, ski pioneer and supercentenarian (b.1875)
January 27 – Norman McLaren, animator and film director (b.1914)
February 19 – Russell Doern, politician (b.1935)
March 21 – Walter L. Gordon, accountant, businessman, politician and writer (b.1906)

July to December
September 11 – Lorne Greene, actor (b.1915)
September 19 – Ralph Steinhauer, native leader, first Aboriginal to become the Lieutenant Governor of Alberta (b.1905)
October 5 – Conrad Bourcier, ice hockey player (b.1915)
October 13 – Hugh Alexander Bryson, politician (b.1912)
October 15 – Juda Hirsch Quastel, biochemist (b.1899)
November 1 – René Lévesque, politician, Minister and 23rd Premier of Quebec (b.1922)
November 6 – George Laurence, nuclear physicist (b.1905)
November 18 – George Ryga, playwright and novelist (b.1932)
November 29 – Gwendolyn MacEwen, novelist and poet (b.1941)

See also
 1987 in Canadian television
 List of Canadian films of 1987

References 

 
Years of the 20th century in Canada
Canada
1987 in North America